Marineland (official name Marineland of Canada Inc.), is a themed zoo and amusement park in Niagara Falls, Ontario, Canada. The park has performing marine animal shows, exhibits of marine and land animals, and amusement rides. It keeps dolphins, sea lions, and beluga whales. Until 2023, the park also kept walruses and orcas. The park also keeps bears, deer, and other land animals. It was founded and operated by John Holer, a Slovenian immigrant, from 1961 until his death in 2018. It is privately owned and operated by his family.

The park's keeping of marine mammals is controversial, and the park is involved in several lawsuits related to the practice. The keeping of the sea mammals is opposed by animal rights activists, and Marineland has been the site of numerous animal rights demonstrations.

Facility
Marineland of Canada keeps about 4,000 land and marine animals. Marineland operates 16 rides ranging from rides for children, to thrill rides for adults. The marine animals perform several times daily at King Waldorf Stadium. The park does not release annual attendance figures. Published amounts range from 250,000 to 500,000 annually.

In 2020, however, the facility did not open in spring as planned because of the restrictions required by the COVID-19 pandemic. The park planned to reopen on July 17, with precautions to minimize the risk of spreading the virus. However, since the Government of Ontario was not allowing amusement parks to open, the facility remained closed.

Marineland is a former member of Canada's Accredited Zoos and Aquariums (CAZA). The company "voluntarily and temporarily" withdrew from CAZA in May 2017, stating it was expanding the area for animals and "will be continuing to work with CAZA to ensure that the expansion is successfully harmonized with CAZA principles".

Marine exhibits
Marineland keeps beluga whales, bottlenose dolphins, grey seals, harbour seals, penguins, sea lions and previously, one orca (Kiska). The belugas are kept in Arctic Cove, Friendship Cove and King Waldorf Stadium. As of August 2021, Marineland had 40 belugas. Marineland at one time had several walruses.

Kiska was the only orca at Marineland from 2011 until her death in 2023. A 2012 report stated that Marineland was then looking for a companion for their orca. On May 28, 2015, the Legislative Assembly of Ontario passed the Prevention of Cruelty to Animals Amendment Act. The act prohibits the possession or breeding of orcas in Ontario while allowing Marineland to keep its orca. Marineland has stated its opposition to moving Kiska, preferring to import "an age-appropriate companion", not allowed under the Ontario law.

Friendship Cove: This exhibit was built for the display of orca whales and now houses belugas. According to Marineland, it is the world's largest whale habitat for viewing above ground and below. There are three pools in Friendship Cove. In pool A, there are 12 belugas: Burnaby, Eve, Horus, Jellybean, Orion, Qila, Neva, Mira, Osiris, Rain and Tuk. Pool B was the habitat for the orca Kiska. It held Kiska from 2011 until her death in March 2023 at age 48. Pool C was a medical pool that Kiska used.
Arctic Cove: Is the main beluga whale exhibit. The design of the exhibit allows viewing above and below ground. Guests also have the opportunity to pet and feed the beluga whales for a fee, until the pandemic hit. These interaction sessions occur throughout the day. There are three pools in Arctic Cove: two habitat pools and a medical pool. There are 24 belugas in pool A: Andre, Kodiak, Tank, Isis and Titan, Skyla, Jetta, Ivy, Acadia and Sahara, Aurora, Kharabali, Frankie, Xavier, Ruby, Yara, Wink, Gemini, Secord, Havok, Lillooet, Nahanni, Kelowna and Skara. There are 14 belugas in pool B: Xena and Calf, Sierra and Calf, Jubilee and Calf, Meeka and Calf, Peekachu and Calf, Caspian and Calf, and Cleo and Calf.
King Waldorf Stadium: Opened on July 1, 1971, this is the main stadium where marine animals perform. The show has sea lions, beluga whales and bottlenose dolphins. There are four habitat pools. In the left side pool are five dolphins: Tsunami, Echo, Lida, Sonar and Marina. In the right side pool, two belugas are kept: Charmin and Tofino. In the two backstage areas, there are five female California sea lions: Holly, Malibu, Sydney, Maui and Cleveland. 
Aquarium Dome: This facility, opened in 1966, is now home to penguins. It also includes a koi pond.
Warehouse:  This area has a four-quadrant pool area, along with a separate pool currently used to house dolphins during the winter months. Marineland has several animals off exhibit from King Waldorf Theatre. This structure was added in the mid-1970s. There are five California sea lions: Holly, Malibu, Sydney, Maui, Cleveland and five dolphins in winter: Lida, Echo, Tsunami, Sonar and Marina.

Splash park
Polar Splash - Opened in 2019

Land animals

Marineland has many animals throughout the park that are not cetaceans or pinnipeds. Marineland has carried over these animals from its days as a 'game farm'.

Bear Country: an area featuring black bears sits below a viewing deck, where visitors can throw Corn Pops cereal (originally marshmallows) to them.
Deer Park: European Fallow Deer are in a fenced-in area which allows people to move about freely. Food is provided for a fee.
Carp Pond: An area in which carp and koi gather around "deck bridges", allowing viewing and feeding for a fee.
Elk and Buffalo: Pens for viewing of these creatures grazing. Feeding also available for a fee.

Rides
Marineland has a collection of different rides, including a pair of roller coasters and a large launched free fall.

Defunct rides

History
The park was founded by John Holer, a Slovenian immigrant who had worked in circuses in Europe. Holer and a partner bought a portion of the Harry Oakes estate near the falls. The park opened in 1961 as "Marine Wonderland and Animal Farm". Holer welded two large steel tanks together and brought in three sea lions and charged one quarter for admission and another to feed the animals. The attraction also featured an underwater show featuring two female swimmers.

In 1963, a trained sea lion "Jeff" escaped from Marine Wonderland and made it to the Niagara River and went over the falls. Holer offered a  reward and organized a helicopter search. The seal was recaptured by Holer a few days later in Queenston, where it was found sunning itself with teenager Tommy Haines, who was given the reward.

In 1964, Holer added two dolphins, along with a few other animals and the attraction became known as "Marineland And Game Farm". By 1966, a 2,000-seat "aquatheatre" was completed along with a "grotto" of aquariums and shops. The grotto in the new Aquarium Dome contained eight tanks used to display fresh-water fish. The park became a popular family attraction and recorded an annual attendance of 250,000 for the 1967 season. In 1968, the park added alligators. Neighbouring attraction "Niagara Falls Indian Village" closed down after the 1968 season and Marineland purchased their property.

In 1971, Marineland added orcas. "Kandu" became the park's major attraction. In 1973, the aquarium purchased "Kandy", a  female orca captured off Vancouver Island in 1973, to mate with Kandu, but she died later that year. Kandu lived until 1979 and was replaced by "Nootka", captured and brought to the park in 1981. Nootka lived until 2008. By 1975, the park kept over 1,000 animals and claimed to be Niagara Falls' "most popular attraction after the falls."

In 1975, Marineland became involved in a controversy over another orca captured off Vancouver Island. The capture of 'Kanduke' by the Sealand of the Pacific aquarium of Victoria, British Columbia, for purchase by Marineland was blocked by the Government of British Columbia, at the instigation of Greenpeace activists. Claimed to be property by the BC government and resources by the Government of Canada, the orca eventually was transported to Marineland after it was determined that orcas were a resource under the control of the Canadian government. The incident led to the ending of the capture of orcas in British Columbia waters.

In 1976, Marineland announced a  expansion on 1,000 adjacent acres, to include a 400-acre "safari park" and amusement centre. Construction began on a new 15,000-seat stadium and pool for killer whales. Marineland purchased two locomotives for a steam train railroad. The "Dragon Mountain" roller coaster opened in 1983 along with other rides. In 1984, Holer announced the postponement of part of the expansion, citing an 86% increase in municipal property taxes, and threatened to move the facility across the river to the United States.

In 1982, Marineland purchased Keiko, a killer whale, from an aquarium in Hafnarfjörður, Iceland. Keiko started performing for the public and developed skin lesions indicative of poor health. He was then sold for $350,000 to Reino Aventura (now named Six Flags México), an amusement park in Mexico City, in 1985. Keiko was the star of the movie Free Willy in 1993. After spending 1996–1998 at Oregon Coast Aquarium, Keiko was returned to a sea pen in Iceland and was released to the ocean in July 2002. He swam to Norway, eventually settling in the Taknes fjord in November 2002, where he was not catching fish and had little contact with wild Orcas; until his death, Keiko was fed daily by the Keiko Project group. Keiko died of pneumonia in December 2003.

In 1986, an unidentified trainer was taken to the hospital after he fell off the park's male killer whale, Kandu 7, and was dragged by his leg around the pool during a trick.

In 2001, Marineland added walruses to the marine mammals it kept. The first walrus was "Sonja", from the Moscow Zoo. It was joined by "Zeus" and "Apollo" two months later and "Pandora", "Buttercup" and "Buddy" in 2002. Marineland added "Smooshi" and "Azul" in 2004. Sonja died in 2017, and Zeus died in 2018.

In 2003, Marineland opened the "Arctic Cove" beluga whale exhibit. Beluga whales were held in Friendship Cove from May 30, 1999, until the opening of Arctic Cove in late 2003. Belugas returned to Friendship Cove in December 2008 following the importation of eight individuals. In 2014, several belugas were switched between Arctic Cove and Friendship Cove.

In 2004, Marineland opened the "Sky Screamer" triple tower ride.

In 2004, Marineland bought the Green Oaks Mobile Home Park across the street from the park with plans to relocate maintenance buildings to the site. In 2009, Marineland evicted 47 families that were tenants at the park. The tenants appealed to the Ontario Landlord and Tenant Board, lost their case and were ordered off the property by March 2010. One tenant committed suicide while others continued to fight Marineland but had to leave in 2011. Holer was ordered to pay $11,000 each to several tenants for harassment.

Holer died on June 23, 2018, aged 82. He was praised as an "immigrant success story" by Senator Don Plett (Manitoba). Holer had been seriously ill for five months and died at his home on Chippewa Parkway. Holer was survived by his wife Marie and son Peter. Another son, John Mark Jr., died in 2013.

The Mayor of Niagara Falls, Jim Diodati, sees Marineland at a "crossroads" with three options: to continue the current business model, to sell its 1,000 acres of land to real estate developers, or to become an amusement park without animals. Diodati favours the latter option. Marineland's lawyer Andrew Burns said that there would be no immediate changes to the business. At the time of his death, Holer was working on a new aviary attraction for Marineland. According to testimony before a Senate of Canada committee in May 2017, the  expansion was described as being one of the largest expansions Marineland has ever made. Holer himself described the overall park as only "half-developed."

On opening day in May 2019, two deer died in a stampede in the deer enclosure, which was reopened for the 2019 season. According to Marineland, a father and son caused the stampede, laughed at staff, and refused to leave the enclosure, then slipped away while staff quieted the animals. Marineland closed the deer enclosure afterwards until modifications are implemented to prevent a future stampede. On May 22, it was announced that the 18-year-old walrus "Apollo" had died of heart failure. It was the fourth walrus to die at Marineland within two years, after "Zeus", "Buttercup" and "Sonja", and left Marineland with a single walrus, "Smooshi". In June, Marineland opened its new "Polar Splash" splash park attraction at a cost of  million.

In June 2019, Marineland signed a ten-year partnership agreement with the Mystic Aquarium's Sea Research Foundation (a subsidiary of Ocean Wise Inc.) for beluga research. In September 2019, it was announced that Marineland had sold two beluga whales to Oceanographic, a Spanish facility owned by Ocean Wise Inc., with the permission of the Canadian government.

Although Marineland opened for the 2020 season, the park could not open the rides due to the COVID-19 pandemic.

Animal rights issues
Since 2012, the park has been the subject of several allegations of poor conditions for its animals by former employees and animal activists have protested outside its gates on several occasions. The park has been inspected by the Ontario Society for the Prevention of Cruelty to Animals (OSPCA) and Canada's Accredited Zoos and Aquariums (CAZA), many times over the years, some leading to orders issued by the OSPCA.

In 2012, articles were published by the Toronto Star alleging animal mistreatment, resulting in negative publicity. An inspection by the OSPCA and CAZA, however, found "no issues of concern". The Star reported that the OSPCA issued orders to Marineland to improve the water conditions for animals at the park and address specific issues with other animals, and that Marineland complied.

In 2015, the Government of Ontario banned the practice of breeding and keeping orcas in captivity, while allowing the existing one to remain at Marineland. Marineland's orca lived without any social interaction with other orcas, but has not been moved.

In November 2016 and January 2017, the OSPCA received a complaint from a former employee through the animal rights organization Last Chance for Animals.  The OSPCA filed some charges against the park in late 2016 and early 2017, but all of the charges were withdrawn by government prosecutors later that year.  Marineland has repeatedly stated publicly that the allegations are the work of disgruntled former employees, who have teamed up with activists wholly opposed to the keeping of animals in captivity and organizations which "seem to financially benefit from any resulting downturn in public opinion towards park operations". Marineland has further maintained that they make every effort to ensure the animals in their care are well provided for. The park employs a number of people who care for the animals day-to-day, as well as an experienced and qualified veterinary staff. Although it is a private facility, Marineland must comply with federal and provincial regulations, as well as comply with several animal welfare enforcement agencies, including regular and "snap" inspections. Marineland has filed nine lawsuits against activists, former employees and the media, and a further lawsuit against the OSPCA for malicious prosecution and reputational damage.

Controversies
Marineland and its owner John Holer were involved in many controversies throughout the park's history. Animal rights activists have picketed regularly outside the park property for several years and continue to protest as of 2018.

In 1977, the U.S. Department of Fisheries seized six bottlenose dolphins that had been illegally caught by John Holer in the Gulf of Mexico.

In 1983, Niagara Falls mayor Wayne Thomson resigned amid controversy over a vacation given as a gift by a Toronto development firm and a land purchase made by his then-fiancé Bonnie Dickson. His fiancé bought some land in Niagara Falls from a seller who did not want it to be sold to Marineland. Seven months later, she sold the plot to Marineland. Holer stated she acted as trustee and was accompanied by Thomson.

In the 1980s, Greenpeace was the first activist group to raise concerns about keeping killer whales in captivity. It objected to the keeping in principle, although it stated that Marineland was one of the better facilities. The level of concern grew in the 1990s. In 1997, a protest was held outside the park by Ric O'Barry, the trainer of "Flipper" of the television series. Other organizations present at the protest included Friends of the Dolphins, Zoocheck Canada and Earth Island Institute. The protesters alleged that Marineland separated mother and child killer whales too quickly and four other whales were stored in unsuitable facilities.

In September 2011, SeaWorld won a court battle with Marineland over the fate of "Ikaika", a killer whale. Ikaika had been originally loaned to Marineland under the terms of a breeding loan agreement between the two organizations, but SeaWorld decided to terminate the agreement due to concerns about Ikaika's mental and physical well-being due to deteriorating conditions at the park. Marineland initially refused to return Ikaika, but was eventually ordered to by the Ontario Superior Court as well as pay $255,000 in compensation to SeaWorld for legal expenses.

On September 10, 2012, the Toronto Star published an article quoting former Marineland supervisor Jim Hammond alleging that Marineland owner John Holer had shot one of the baby deer in his park through the windpipe with a 12-gauge shotgun, leaving it to choke on its blood without dying. Hammond claimed the park owner refused his pleas for humane euthanasia.

On December 20, 2012, the Ontario Ministry of the Environment announced an investigation into several mass animal graves at the park. The ministry had no previous knowledge of the graves, as Marineland lacks permits for such use. After an investigation by the ministry, Marineland was allowed to continue using a section of the site for animal burials.

On March 5, 2013, the Toronto Star published an article quoting Hammond and a local resident alleging that John Holer had shot two Labrador Retrievers that had escaped a neighbour's house and entered Marineland property. The article also mentioned that Hammond was told by Holer "to check if there were any collars ... around their necks and if there were, to remove them."

In September 2013, it was reported that the Ontario Veterinary College was investigating an unspecified number of veterinarians at Marineland.

Also in 2013, OSPCA investigated the claims of some former employees of Marineland claimed that the animals' health was being put at risk by low water quality. OSPCA used the results of the investigation to make suggestions to the subsequent provincial review of its animal welfare laws.

In April 2014, the Vancouver newspaper The Georgia Straight published an article alleging that five harbour seals transferred from the Vancouver Aquarium had fallen ill at Marineland due to "poor water chemistry". According to the article, one, "Pepper" died in 2006 from the conditions while the rest were blind. Marineland filed a  lawsuit in July 2014 against The Georgia Straight and the article's writer for defamation and damages. According to Marineland, Pepper did not die as described in the article and the others were not blind but were in fact generally healthy. It was the eighth lawsuit filed by Marineland since 2012, and the third against a media outlet.

In 2015, the Government of Ontario took up debate of the keeping of orcas. Bob Barker urged Ontario Premier Kathleen Wynne to order Marineland to give up Kiska and other animals. On May 28, 2015, the Legislative Assembly of Ontario passed the Prevention of Cruelty to Animals Amendment Act. The act prohibits the possession or breeding of orcas in Ontario but allowed Marineland to keep its orca.

On May 10, 2016, Marineland filed a lawsuit against filmmaker Zach Affolter to prevent the release of his documentary, Black Water. The park alleges that the film contains footage illegally taken at Marineland and is a violation of their policy preventing the use of footage for commercial purposes. Affolter responded by asserting that "Black Water is meant as an educational, non-commercial film that dives into the moral question behind keeping cetaceans in captivity." Marineland demanded  million in damages for breach of its intellectual property rights. Affolter denied the allegations and said he had found the video of Kiska on Facebook. Until the lawsuit was resolved, the film's release was on hold.

Demers allegations
In May 2012, Philip Demers, trainer of the walrus "Smooshi," resigned from Marineland. He had been an employee of Marineland for 12 years and had been noted for his close relationship with Smooshi. Demers made public his concerns about Marineland and has been sued by Marineland. In Demers' version of accounts, Smooshi was moved from Marineland's barn to the Aquarium, where Demers said she deteriorated because of problems with the water. Smooshi was returned to the barn but problems returned. He asked for more walrus trainers, but his request was denied. By 2012, he had had responsibilities for hiring and training employees taken away, and he chose to resign. He continues to speak out about Marineland.

On August 15, 2012, the Toronto Star published an article of Demers' account, alleging that many sea mammals at Marineland live in inhumane conditions and suffer from a variety of illnesses caused by problems with water quality and chronic understaffing. Holer denied the allegations in the report, which was largely based on interviews conducted with former Marineland employees. The Ontario Society for the Prevention of Cruelty to Animals  declined to press charges, but did order changes in park procedures that were then implemented by Marineland. The controversies led to Suzie McNeil, singer of the park's jingle, "Everyone Loves Marineland", to ask the park to no longer use her recording.

Demers's campaign against the institution is profiled in the 2020 documentary film The Walrus and the Whistleblower. It was released as part of the Hot Docs Documentary Film Festival. It documented the relationship former Marineland trainer Phil Demers had with the walrus Smooshi before he quit in 2012 and became a vocal critic of the park. In June 2020, the film was named as the winner of 2020 Rogers Audience Award and as Overall Favourite at the Hot Docs Canadian International Documentary Festival. The Audience Award allowed the film to be fast tracked in the Academy Award for Best Documentary Feature category, "provided it meets all other criteria for eligibility".

The CBC's Documentary Channel item about the film stated that Demers had "appeared four times on the Joe Rogan show, has testified before the Canadian Senate, and is being sued for $1.5 million for plotting to steal Smooshi, the walrus".

On September 20, 2022, Demers and the park reached a non-costs agreement where the walrus Smooshi and her calf Koyuk would be rehomed. The two walruses were removed to SeaWorld Abu Dhabi in March 2023.

Ending the Captivity of Whales and Dolphins Act
In 2015, then-Senator Wilfred Moore of the Senate of Canada introduced Bill S-203, the Ending the Captivity of Whales and Dolphins Act. Marineland would be one of two facilities in Canada to be affected by the law after the bill is passed. Marineland, along with the Vancouver Aquarium, opposed the bill. According to Marineland, the Act advances an agenda of entrenching animal rights into the legal framework: "the granting of the rights of a person to whales—what activists call a 'non- human person'—and then to other species". The bill would "fundamentally and critically damage Marineland" and "essentially destroy Marineland's future".  Marineland believes that it has enough belugas, but it wanted to get more porpoises in the future and a companion for its one orca.

In September 2017, Green Party of Canada leader Elizabeth May filed a complaint to the Parliament of Canada's Lobbying Commissioner about Marineland's breaches of the Canadian Lobbying Act. Marineland had privately lobbied Members of Parliament and Senators without registering with the Lobbying Commissioner in efforts to stop Bill S-203. Marineland's lawyer Andrew Burns registered as a lobbyist in May 2018.

Progressive Conservatives in the Senate, led by Sen. Don Plett, used procedural obstruction to keep the bill from moving to a vote. In June 2018, the senators added amendments intended to exclude Marineland and the Vancouver Aquarium from being covered by the bill.

The bill was passed by the Senate in October 2018 and was sent to the House of Commons of Canada. Andrew Burns, Marineland's lawyer appeared at a House Fisheries Committee meeting in March 2019, to propose an amendment regarding future beluga births at Marineland, claiming the new law is unconstitutional. Senator Murray Sinclair, the bill's second sponsor in the Senate and a former judge, told MPs no one is going to be prosecuted when currently pregnant belugas give birth. In the opinion of Sinclair and May, Burns was only intending to delay the bill, so that it could not be passed before the end of the current session of the Parliament of Canada. The bill was passed by committee without amendments. The bill passed third and final reading in the House of Commons on June 10, 2019.

Ontario SPCA charges 

In 2012, the Ontario Society for the Prevention of Cruelty to Animals received complaints of animal abuse at the park from former employees and issued orders to Marineland as to the standard of care they should be following. At that time, a full investigation was not conducted. On November 10, 2016, however, the agency received a formal 35-page complaint—compiled by California-based group Last Chance for Animals—which included photographs and videos taken by a former Marineland employee whose identity has not been revealed to the public. (The Canadian Press obtained a copy of the complaint file which was reviewed by some members of the news media; only excerpts have been published.) At that time, the OSPCA began an investigation of possible animal abuse at the park using its staff and a veterinarian.

On November 25, 2016, the OSPCA charged Marineland with five counts of animal cruelty under the Ontario SPCA Act over their treatment of peafowls, guineafowls, and American black bears in the zoo portion of the park. The Ontario SPCA alleged that the animals were distressed and did not receive the required standard of care from Marineland. The company denied the allegations.

Marineland also provided a statement to The Canadian Press: "(Last Chance for Animals) is working together with the fired former employee to exact revenge over his firing and advance their radical cause and goal to shut Marineland." The company also posted a commentary on their Web site indicating that it is "being attacked by disgruntled former employees again, who are working with a professional activist group that raises just under 2 million dollars per year to share their distorted view of facts about others." The post indicated that the company would "vigorously defend ourselves against these charges laid by the OSPCA".

A news article on August 10, 2017, stated that the park had started a lawsuit against former employee Philip Demers, one of those who had filed complaints with the OSPCA, for $1.5 million and that this is only one of nine lawsuits against activists, former employees and the media since 2012. None of the suits has been resolved in court.

Six additional counts of animal cruelty were laid by the OSPCA on January 9, 2017. The new charges related to the treatment of elk, red deer and fallow deer. Deputy chief Jennifer Bluhm of the OSPCA provided the following comment: "While the investigation is still ongoing, these are all the charges we expect to be laid in this case." On previous occasions, Marineland had stated that it would defend against charges in court. The company's first appearance to plead to the charges was set for January 26, 2017.

On the same day, Marineland posted another response on its website, critical of the OSPCA handling of the investigation and the charges, including the following comment: "We believe the OSPCA is continuing a publicity campaign at the behest of a band of discredited activists with little relevant expertise or knowledge, in an effort to avoid further embarrassment related to an ongoing investigation into the OSPCA’s perceived failure to protect animals that is being led by the same activists they are now firmly in bed with. ... We will hold the OSPCA to the high standards of Ontario’s legal system and require them to defend their charges to the fullest extent possible."

On August 10, 2017, all charges were withdrawn in Niagara Falls Provincial court. The prosecutor stated that there was no likelihood of conviction and pursuit of the matters was found to not be in the public interest The OSPCA inspected the park a week later and did not find any issues of concern.

In October 2017, Marineland filed a lawsuit against the OSPCA, alleging that the OSPCA launched its investigation purely to harm Marineland. "It was motivated by a series of improper objectives, including a desire to accomplish its own policy agenda, to mollify the animal activist community, to please its donors, and to effectively destroy Marineland." Marineland is seeking  in damages. The OSPCA responded publicly that it "vehemently denies all of the allegations and will defend itself."

A subsequent pleading by the OSPCA's stated that any losses suffered by Marineland due to the charges "are entirely the result of its own misconduct and that (Marineland) is the author of its own misfortune."

Beluga whale deaths

 Dee, a beluga whale imported from Russia, died in August 2000 after a petting session. At the time, news reports indicated that this was the third recent death; in December 1999 another female beluga died from liver failure and in March 2000, "Malik", a three-year-old orca, died. This led two animal rights groups to urge the Government of Canada to issue a moratorium on the import of belugas.
 Sasha, a beluga whale born in 2008 at Marineland, died around October 10, 2011, several days before the off-season.
 On May 28, 2012, a nine-month-old beluga, Skoot, born to Skyla, succumbed to its injuries after a two-hour attack by two adult males in a shared tank. Only an untrained guide was on hand to try to stop the attack and he said it took a long time for trainers to respond. By that time, the calf had already died. Marineland's John Holer told the news media that the calf died because of meningitis.
 In May 2013, an aquatic inventory website (Ceta-Base.org) reported that belugas Luna and Charlotte were both deceased and said these were the latest of 18 other beluga deaths over the years. The site's August 2017 report indicates additional beluga deaths, some without a date, with the most recent (named R1) having been on July 30, 2015. Charlotte died from a metabolic disorder; the cause of death for Luna was not known.
 In August 2017, Gia (who had been born at the park) died suddenly. A preliminary report indicated that the cause may have been a twisted small intestine that resulted in a fatal blockage. The Ceta-Base site indicates that Gia had been born in 2012.

Orca deaths
A Toronto Star report in November 2012 stated that "Marineland has had 26 killer whales over roughly three decades, according to ... Zoocheck Canada. Of these, 17 died at Marineland. ... Six died in other parks after being transferred while one died en route from Marineland to Japan". The following include orca deaths that were well documented.

 An unnamed whale died at the park in October 1992 from drowning.
 Junior, a wild Icelandic male orca, being kept in an indoor barn, died in June 1994.
 Kanuck, separated from mother, Kiska and stored in a warehouse. Died at age 4 in 1998.
 An unnamed whale born at Marineland died in June 1998.
 Malik, a three-year-old orca, died due to a deficient immune system in March 2000.
 Nova died in August 2001.
 Algonquin died in August 2002 due to a twisted intestine.
 April died in April 2004.
 Neocia died in August 2004 at Marineland. The death of this 12 year old whale was reported as the fifth in five years at the Ontario park.
 Hudson died in October 2004 with the cause of death being meningitis.
 Kandu, a wild whale from Iceland that had been at the park since the 1980s, died on December 21, 2005.
 Katak/Splash was born at Marineland and was moved to SeaWorld in 1992 for health treatment. He died in April 2005.
 Nootka V died in January 2008 at Marineland. Nootka had been brought to Marineland in 1979 after being captured near Iceland.
 Athena died sometime in spring 2009. The cause of death was by infection.
 An unnamed whale died while being moved from Marineland to Japan.
 Kiska the park's last remaining orca died from bacterial infection on March 10, 2023

Advertising
Marineland's main advertising comes through a series of radio and television commercials with the jingle "Everyone Loves Marineland".  Marineland has also used other slogans over the years in its advertising:

"Come to Marineland" – (1980–1984)
"Where the Fun Never Stops" – (1985–1988)
"Happiness is Marineland" – (1987–1992) 
"Everyone Loves Marineland" – (1993–2020)
"Underwater Fantasy at Marineland" (2020s-present)

See also
 List of captive orcas
 Miami Seaquarium

References

External links

Images from the Historic Niagara Digital Collections

Animal theme parks
Amusement parks in Canada
Culture of Niagara Falls, Ontario
Oceanaria
Tourist attractions in Niagara Falls, Ontario
1961 establishments in Ontario
Zoos in Ontario
Aquaria in Canada
Amusement parks opened in 1961